Hemdat is a community Israeli settlement in the West Bank located near the Palestinian hamlet of Khirbet Makhoul, in the Jordan River Valley on a plain at an altitude of 178 metres along the Allon Road in the municipal jurisdiction of the Bik'at HaYarden Regional Council. Other Jewish settlements  in the area are Ro'i and Beka'ot. The closest city, Beit Shean, is a thirty-minute drive north of Hemdat.

The international community considers Israeli settlements in the West Bank illegal under international law, but the Israeli government disputes this.

History
Hemdat was first established in 1979 as a pioneer Nahal military outpost that was soon thereafter demilitarized and turned into a kibbutz when turned over to residential purposes to a group of pioneers from Hashomer Hatzair and Israel Boy and Girl Scouts Federation. Due to the harsh living conditions of the valley (intense heat, distant location) and other obstacles, this group abandoned the kibbutz and the village was returned to the Israel Defense Forces Nahal brigade. In 1997, a new group organized by the Amana settlement organization and moved to resettle Hemdat. This group was made up of students at the Bnei David pre-military yeshiva academy in Eli and one family named Shitrit.

Education
Three months after the re-founding of the village, a religious pre-military academy was established called Hemdat Yehuda.

Other educational institutions include a nursery school and a kindergarten. Young children learn at the elementary school on the Sde Eliyahu kibbutz. The older youth learn at the Sde Eliyahu High School, and other institutions in the area and elsewhere.

Population
Hemdat does not have a homogeneous population and it is made up of a mixed group of families from different Jewish ethnic backgrounds and locations in Israel. There is one central synagogue that serves the village, as well as religious services at the academy.

References

External links
Village profile
Hemdat Yehuda pre-military academy

Religious Israeli settlements
Nahal settlements
Populated places established in 1979
Community settlements
1979 establishments in the Israeli Military Governorate
Israeli settlements in the West Bank